Earl Bradley Lewis (born December 16, 1956) is an American artist and illustrator. He is best known for his watercolor illustrations for children's books such as Jacqueline Woodson’s The Other Side and Jabari Asim’s Preaching to the Chickens: The Story of Young John Lewis.

Lewis has been awarded prizes for his illustration work including the 2016 New York Times Best Illustrated Book Award for Preaching to the Chickens: The Story of Young John Lewis and the 2004 Caldecott Honor Award for Jacqueline Woodson's Coming on Home Soon.

Lewis resides in Folsom, New Jersey and teaches at the Pennsylvania Academy of Fine Arts in Philadelphia.

Personal life
Earl Bradley Lewis was born on December 16, 1956, in Philadelphia, Pennsylvania.

Gathering early inspiration from two uncles who were also artists, Lewis exhibited artistic promise from the third grade on. In the sixth grade, he began attending the School of Art League at Temple University on Saturday mornings. Lewis later attended the Tyler School of Art at Temple University where he developed a love for watercolors.

At Temple, Lewis majored in illustration, graphic design and art education. After graduating, he taught art for twelve years in public schools and at the Trenton Psychiatric Hospital. Presently, alongside his fine art painting and illustration work, Lewis teaches at the University of the Arts in Philadelphia.

Career 
E.B. Lewis has illustrated more than seventy books for children.

Lewis' career as an illustrator of children's books began in 1992 after his watercolors in Artist Magazine were noticed by agents Elizabeth O’Grady and her husband, Jeff Dwyer. They had ties to an art director from Simon & Schuster who at that time was seeking African American artists to illustrate children's books. After talking over the details, Lewis was on board. Over the next year, he quit his teaching job and completed illustrations for his first collaboration with Jane Kurtz's Fire On The Mountain.

Since then, he has provided illustrations for books such as Nikki Grimes' Talkin' About Bessie: The Story of Aviator Elizabeth Coleman, Alice Schertle's Down the Road, Tolowa M. Mollel's My Rows and Piles of Coins, Gavin Curtis' Bat Boy and His Violin, Mary Ann Rodman's My Best Friend, and Jacqueline Woodson's The Other Side.

One book, Circle Unbroken written by Margot Theis Raven, was later set to music of the late composer, William Grant Still, and performed in 2007 by members of Chamber Music Charleston for educational performances. A short film of the same name was also produced, featuring these performances alongside Lewis' illustrations.

In 2003, a collection of Lewis’ original watercolors from the first fifty children's books he illustrated was purchased by The Kerlan Collection at the University of Minnesota. His work is also in private collections throughout the United States.

In 2011, Lewis took a two and a half year hiatus to develop the direction of his fine art work, citing that he wanted to "speak to what’s happening in our society". The result of this was his "Lotto Icons" series, consisting of paintings on lottery tickets. These were covered with gold leaf and scratched away revealing solemn faces of impoverished children.

He currently sits on the board of the Hall of Fame of Children's Book Writers and Illustrators and is a member of The Society of Illustrators in New York City.

Awards and honors

 1996 - ALA Notable Children's Book Award for Down the Road by Alice Schertle
 1999 - Coretta Scott King Award Winner for The Bat Boy and His Violin by Gavin Curtis
 2002 - Notable Book for the Language Arts Award for The Other Side by Jacqueline Woodson
 2003 - Coretta Scott King Award Winner for Talkin’ About Bessie: The Story of Aviator Elizabeth Coleman by Nikki Grimes
 2004 - Caldecott Honor Award for Coming on Home Soon by Jacqueline Woodson
 2006 - Charlotte Zolotow Award for My Best Friend by Mary Ann Rodman
 2009 - Orbis Picture Award for The Secret World of Walter Anderson by Hester Bass
 2016 - New York Times Best Illustrated Book Award, Kirkus Best Illustrated Book Award, and the Golden Kite Honor Award for Preaching to the Chickens: The Story of Young John Lewis by Jabari Asim

References

External links
  "E. B. Lewis – Artistrator"
 

Living people
1956 births
American children's book illustrators
African-American illustrators
People from Folsom, New Jersey
Artists from Philadelphia
21st-century African-American people
20th-century African-American people